Ian Robert Flockhart McKelvie (born 1952) is a New Zealand politician and a member of the New Zealand House of Representatives. He is a member of the National Party.

Early life and career
McKelvie was born to parents John and Rosemary in Palmerston North. His family has lived near the Rangitīkei river since 1850. He was educated at Wanganui Collegiate School. He then gained a Diploma of Agriculture from Massey University and worked on several farms, including a sheep, beef, dairy and cropping farm at Tangimoana with one of his brothers. He has also worked in the motor vehicle, property and insurance industries, including with Farmers’ Mutual Group, and served as national president of the Royal Agricultural Society for four years until 2002.

He was the Mayor of Manawatu from 2002 until 2011. He resigned from the position on being elected to Parliament. , he was the longest-serving mayor of the district to date, being in office for 9 years and 20 days.

He served as the board chair of Special Olympics New Zealand from October 2010 until 2019.

Member of Parliament

Fifth National Government, 2011–2017
McKelvie was named as the National Party candidate for the  electorate following the announcement by sitting member Simon Power of his retirement from politics.  At the 2011 election, McKelvie won the seat with a majority of 9,382 ahead of Labour's Josie Pagani.  He served on three select committees: primary production, regulations review, and law and order.

McKelvie was re-elected in the Rangitīkei electorate during the 2014 New Zealand general election with an increased majority. Following the 2014 general election, McKelvie served a second term on the law and order committee and was chair of the primary production committee.

Sixth Labour Government, 2017–present
McKelvie was re-elected in the Rangitīkei electorate during the 2017 New Zealand general election. Following the formation of a Labour-led coalition government, McKelvie served as the National Party's spokesperson on seniors' and veterans' issues between 3 November 2017 and 12 March 2018. He also served on the transport and infrastructure committees between November 2017 and March 2018. From March 2019 to November 2020 he was National's spokesperson for fisheries and racing and was a member of the finance and expenditure committee. 

On 11 December 2019, McKelvie's Dog Control (Category 1 Offences) Amendment Bill passed its first reading with the support of all parties except the Green Party. This amendment means that low-level offences involving dogs including animal cruelty will be heard by a justice of the peace or community magistrate rather than going through the district courts. The bill subsequently passed its third reading and received royal assent in December 2019.

During the 2020 New Zealand general election, McKelvie was re-elected in Rangitīkei by a final margin of 2,961 votes. After the election he continued as racing spokesperson and also picked up the forestry and seniors portfolios. He is also chairperson of the governance and administration committee and, on 1 March 2022, was appointed as an additional Assistant Speaker, to serve while the House is sitting with MPs participating remotely during the COVID-19 pandemic. He will retire at the 2023 New Zealand general election.

Political views 
McKelvie has generally conservative views but has on occasion adopted more liberal positions on legislation that required a conscience vote. He supported the first reading of the Marriage (Definition of Marriage) Amendment Act 2013, but not the second or third reading, and supported the first and second reading of the Abortion Legislation Act 2020, but not the third reading. In his third reading speech on the Abortion Legislation Bill he said he was concerned that the Bill did not provide enough support for women or protections against abortions after 20 weeks. At the second reading of the Marriage (Definition of Marriage) Amendment Bill, he supported Winston Peters' amendments to prerequisite the Bill's passage on a successful referendum outcome.

He supported the End of Life Choice Act 2019, which legalised voluntary euthanasia, at all stages. He voted against Chlöe Swarbrick's member's bill to legalise medicinal cannabis in 2018.

References

1950s births
Living people
People from Palmerston North
People educated at Whanganui Collegiate School
Massey University alumni
New Zealand National Party MPs
Members of the New Zealand House of Representatives
New Zealand MPs for North Island electorates
Mayors of Manawatu
21st-century New Zealand politicians
Candidates in the 2017 New Zealand general election
1952 births